The All-Ireland Senior Hurling Championship 1973 was the 87th series of the All-Ireland Senior Hurling Championship, Ireland's premier hurling knock-out competition.  Limerick won the championship, beating Kilkenny 1-21 to 1-14 in the final at Croke Park, Dublin.

Format

Overview
The All-Ireland Senior Hurling Championship of 1973 was run on a provincial basis as usual.  It was a knockout tournament with pairings drawn at random in the respective provinces - there were no seeds.

Each match was played as a single leg. If a match was drawn there was a replay.  If both sides were still level at the end of that game another replay had to take place.

The Championship

Munster Championship

Quarter-final: (1 match) This was a single match between the first two teams drawn from the province of Munster.

Semi-finals: (2 matches) The winner of the lone quarter-final joined the other three Munster teams to make up the semi-final pairings.

Final: (1 match) The winner of the two semi-finals contested this game.

Leinster Championship

First Round: (1 match) This was a single match between two of the 'weaker' teams drawn from the province of Leinster.

Quarter-finals: (2 matches) The winner of the first-round game joined three other Leinster teams to make up the two quarter-final pairings.

Semi-finals: (2 matches) The winners of the two quarter-finals joined Kilkenny and Wexford, who received a bye to this stage, to make up the semi-final pairings.

Final: (1 match) The winner of the two semi-finals contested this game.

All-Ireland Championship

Quarter-final: (1 match) This was a single match between London and Galway, two teams who faced no competition in their respective provinces.

Semi-final: (1 matches) The winner of the lone quarter-final joined  the Munster champions to make up the semi-final pairing.

Final: (1 match) The winner of the lone semi-final contested this game with the Leinster champions receiving a bye into the final.

Results

Leinster Senior Hurling Championship

Munster Senior Hurling Championship

All-Ireland Senior Hurling Championship

Top scorers

Overall

Single game

Championship statistics

Miscellaneous

 Limerick win the Munster title for the first time since 1955.
 Kilkenny win the Leinster title for the third consecutive year. It is their seventh provincial three-in-a-row.
 London's win over Galway in the All-Ireland quarter-final is their first championship victory since defeating Cork in the 1901 All-Ireland final.
 In the All-Ireland semi-final between Limerick and London, a unique situation arose when brothers Ned and Gerry Rea marked one another. Ned was full-forward on the Limerick team while Gerry was at full-back for London.
 Limerick win the All-Ireland title for the first time since 1940. It was their first time playing Kilkenny in the championship since then.

Player facts

Debutantes

The following players made their début in the 1973 championship:

Retirees
The following players played their last game in the 1973 championship:

Sources

 Corry, Eoghan, The GAA Book of Lists (Hodder Headline Ireland, 2005).
 Donegan, Des, The Complete Handbook of Gaelic Games (DBA Publications Limited, 2005).
 Sweeney, Éamonn, Munster Hurling Legends (The O'Brien Press, 2002).

See also

1973
All-Ireland Senior Hurling Championship